Will Jones may refer to:

Will Jones (racing driver) (1889–1972), American racecar driver
Will Jones (baseball) (1896–?), American Negro leagues baseball player
Will Jones (rugby union) (born 1998), Welsh rugby player
Dub Jones (singer) (Will J. Jones, 1928–2000), American singer
Will Jones (died 1922), lynched in Ellaville, Georgia, USA, see Lynching of Will Jones

See also
William Jones (disambiguation)
Willie Jones (disambiguation)
Bill Jones (disambiguation)
Billy Jones (disambiguation)